Produce Camp 2019, or alternatively known as CHUANG 2019, is a Chinese male group reality television show premiered on Tencent Video on April 6, 2019 as the second season of Produce 101 China. Final members debuted as R1SE.

The series is jointly produced by 7-D Vision and Tencent Penguin Pictures for Tencent Video, under license from Mnet's owner CJ E&M.

Mentors 
The series was presented by Dilraba Dilmurat. Other artists featured as cast members:

 Vocal training:
Alec Su
 Rap training: 
Stanley Huang
 Dance training:
Aaron Kwok
 Composition training:
Tiger Hu

Contestants
Contestants are chosen through popularity online voting.

Color key

 Left the show
 Top 11 of the week
 Saved from elimination
 Eliminated in Episode 4
 Eliminated in Episode 7
 Eliminated in Episode 9
 Eliminated in Episode 10
 Final debuting member

Evaluations 
Color key

Color key

Ranking
Color key

 New Top 11

Discography

Singles

Franchise

References

External links

Chinese reality television series
Produce 101
2019 Chinese television series debuts
Chinese television series based on South Korean television series
Tencent original programming
Mandarin-language television shows
2019 in Chinese music